Ricardo Sanchez Colclough (born September 26, 1983) is a former Canadian football cornerback  and linebacker in the Canadian Football League (CFL). He was drafted by the Pittsburgh Steelers in the second round of the 2004 NFL Draft. He played college football at Kilgore College for one season (2001) under head coach Jimmy Rieves on an undefeated NJCAA football team, then played at Tusculum.

Colclough has also been a member of the Cleveland Browns, Carolina Panthers, and Kansas City Chiefs. He earned a Super Bowl ring with the Steelers in Super Bowl XL against the Seattle Seahawks.

Professional career

Pittsburgh Steelers
He was drafted with the sixth pick of the second round of the 2004 NFL Draft out of Tusculum College. He is perhaps best known for his momentum-shifting muffed punt in week three of the 2006 season.  With the Steelers up 17 to 14 against the Cincinnati Bengals, Colclough was back for a punt with roughly eight minutes remaining.  He attempted to field the punt by raising his hands above his head, then dropping the punt.  He and teammate free safety Tyrone Carter both had a chance to recover, but both failed.  One play after the miscue, Bengals quarterback Carson Palmer hit wide receiver T. J. Houshmandzadeh for a score.  The Steelers ended up losing the game, 28-20.

Colclough was put on the injured reserve list in early October of the 2006 NFL season. On October 30, 2007, Colclough was released by the Steelers after appearing in three games.

Cleveland Browns
The next day, he was claimed off waivers by the Cleveland Browns. He was with the team the rest of the 2007 season, but did not play in any games for the Browns before becoming a free agent.

Carolina Panthers
On March 1, 2008, Colclough signed a two-year, $4 million contract with the Carolina Panthers. Colclough was released by the Panthers on August 30, 2008, hours after receiving a DWI.

Kansas City Chiefs
Colclough was signed by the Kansas City Chiefs on November 5, 2008. He was waived on September 29, 2009.

Omaha Nighthawks
Colclough was signed by the Omaha Nighthawks in 2010. He was re-signed by the team on July 15, 2011.

Edmonton Eskimos
On March 12, 2012, Colclough signed with the Edmonton Eskimos of the Canadian Football League.  In two games, he recorded 6 tackles.

Hamilton Tiger-Cats
On September 13, 2012, Colclough was traded from the Eskimos to the Hamilton Tiger-Cats along with a 6th round pick the CFL draft for non-import fullback Darcy Brown. Colclough was released by the Tiger-Cats on July 18, 2013

Toronto Argonauts
On July 23, 2013, Colclough signed with the Toronto Argonauts. He was released by the Argonauts on May 26, 2014.

References

External links
CFL stats
stats
Just Sports Stats

1983 births
Living people
American football cornerbacks
Carolina Panthers players
Cleveland Browns players
Edmonton Elks players
Hamilton Tiger-Cats players
Kansas City Chiefs players
Kilgore Rangers football players
Omaha Nighthawks players
Sportspeople from Sumter, South Carolina
Pittsburgh Steelers players
Players of American football from South Carolina
Toronto Argonauts players
Tusculum Pioneers football players